Hyper-IgM syndrome type 4 is a form of Hyper IgM syndrome which is a defect in class switch recombination downstream of the AICDA gene that does not impair somatic hypermutation.

Hyper IgM syndromes 

Hyper IgM syndromes is a group of primary immune deficiency disorders characterized by defective CD40 signaling; via B cells affecting class switch recombination (CSR) and somatic hypermutation. Immunoglobulin (Ig) class switch recombination deficiencies are characterized by elevated serum IgM levels and a considerable deficiency in Immunoglobulins G (IgG), A (IgA) and E (IgE). As a consequence, people with HIGM  have an increased susceptibility to infections.

Signs and symptoms
Hyper IgM syndrome can have the following syndromes:
 Infection/Pneumocystis pneumonia (PCP), which is common in infants with hyper IgM syndrome, is a serious illness. PCP is one of the most frequent and severe opportunistic infections in people with weakened immune systems.
 Hepatitis (Hepatitis C)
 Chronic diarrhea
 Hypothyroidism
 Neutropenia
 Arthritis
 Encephalopathy (degenerative)

Cause

Different genetic defects cause HIgM syndrome, the vast majority are inherited as an X-linked recessive genetic trait and most sufferers are male.

IgM is the form of antibody that all B cells produce initially before they undergo class switching. Healthy B cells efficiently switch to other types of antibodies as needed to attack invading bacteria, viruses, and other pathogens. In people with hyper IgM syndromes, the B cells keep making IgM antibodies because can not switch to a different antibody. This results in an overproduction of IgM antibodies and an underproduction of IgA, IgG, and IgE.

Pathophysiology
CD40 is a costimulatory receptor on B cells that, when bound to CD40 ligand (CD40L), sends a signal to the B-cell receptor. When there is a defect in CD40, this leads to defective T-cell interaction with B cells. Consequently, humoral immune response is affected. Patients are more susceptible to infection.

Diagnosis
The diagnosis of hyper IgM syndrome can be done via the following methods and tests:
 MRI
 Chest radiography
 Pulmonary function test
 Lymph node test
 Laboratory test (to measure CD40)

Treatment
In terms of treatment for hyper IgM syndrome, there is the use of allogeneic hematopoietic cell transplantation. Additionally, anti-microbial therapy, use of granulocyte colony-stimulating factor, immunosuppressants, as well as other treatments, may be needed.

References

Immune system disorders
Rare syndromes